Robert Young (born 13 September 1940 in Edinburgh) is a former Scotland international rugby union player. He became the 115th President of the Scottish Rugby Union.

Rugby Union career

Amateur career

Young played for Watsonians.

Provincial career

He played for Edinburgh District in the 1970–71 Scottish Inter-District Championship.

International career

He played for Scotland once, in 1970.

Administrative career

He became the 115th President of the Scottish Rugby Union. He served the standard one year from 2001 to 2002.

References

1940 births
Living people
Scottish rugby union players
Scotland international rugby union players
Presidents of the Scottish Rugby Union
Watsonians RFC players
Edinburgh District (rugby union) players
Rugby union players from Edinburgh
Rugby union scrum-halves